Lorain may refer to:

Places
 Lorain, Ohio
 Lorain, Pennsylvania
 Lorain, Wisconsin
 Lorain County, Ohio
 Lorain County Community College
 Lorain Township, Minnesota

People
 René Lorain (born 1900), French athlete
 Sophie Lorain, Canadian actress

Organizations
 Lorain City School District
 Lorain Correctional Institution
 Lorain County Transit
 Lorain, Ashland & Southern Railroad

Other uses
 Milkovich v. Lorain Journal Co.
 USS Lorain (PF-93)

See also
 Loraine (disambiguation)
 Lorrain (disambiguation)
 Lorraine (disambiguation)